Robert Dimsdale (1 July 1828 – 2 May 1898) was an English banker and Conservative politician who sat in the House of Commons in two periods between 1866 and 1892.
 
Dimsdale was born at Hatfield, Hertfordshire, the son of Charles John Dimsdale, and his wife Jemima Pye. He was educated at Eton and Corpus Christi College, Oxford. Dimsdale was a J.P. and a Deputy Lieutenant  for Hertfordshire  and a J.P. for Middlesex and Westminster.

In 1872 he became the sixth Baron Dimsdale of the Russian Empire on the death of his father, Charles John. The barony had been conferred by Catherine the Great on an ancestor, Thomas Dimsdale (1712-1800), who had inoculated the Empress and her son against smallpox in 1769.
 
Dimsdale stood unsuccessfully for parliament at Hertford  in 1859. He was elected Member of Parliament for Hertford in 1866 and held the seat until 1874. He was elected for Hitchin  in 1885, and held the seat until 1892.

Dimsdale married Cecilia Jane Southwell and lived at Essendon Place, Essendon, Hertfordshire which was the family seat.

References

External links

Photographic portrait at St Albans museum

1825 births
1898 deaths
People educated at Eton College
Alumni of Corpus Christi College, Oxford
Conservative Party (UK) MPs for English constituencies
Russian nobility
UK MPs 1865–1868
UK MPs 1868–1874
UK MPs 1885–1886
UK MPs 1886–1892
People from Essendon, Hertfordshire
Barons of the Russian Empire